Scissor grinder cicada may refer to:

 Neotibicen pruinosus, or "Scissor grinder"
 Neotibicen latifasciatus, or "Coastal scissor grinder"
 Neotibicen winnemanna, or "Eastern scissor grinder"

Animal common name disambiguation pages